Habib Ben Romdhane (born 9 July 1970) is a Tunisian football coach and former player who played for JS Kairouan. He is the current manager of FDL club Al-Qadsiah.

Career
Ben Romdhane spent his whole playing career for JS Kairouan. He made his debut in 1987 aged 17 years old and retired in 2001.

Ben Romdhane began his managerial career in 2004 working as Mourad Okbi's assistant at Al-Shoulla. In 2005, Ben Romdhane moved to Al-Watani to once again work as Okbi's assistant manager. On 3 August 2006, Ben Romdhane joined Al-Watani to work as Aboud El Khodary's assistant. Working as Al-Watani's assistant manager, Ben Romdhane managed to achieve promotion to the Saudi Premier League for the first time in the club's history. Ben Romdhane continued to work as Al-Watani's assistant, first under El Khodary during the 2007–08 season and then under Moussa Saïb during the 2008–09 season. Following Saïb's departure, Ben Romdhane was named as caretaker manager on 21 October 2008. On 29 November 2008, Ben Romdhane was named as Hélio Vieira's assistant. On 11 July 2009, Ben Romdhane was named as Al-Watani's manager following their relegation to the First Division. On 17 November 2009, Ben Romdhane was relieved from his duties and was replaced by Aboud El Khodary. On 11 January 2010, Ben Romdhane returned to work as Okbi's assistant at Najran.

In August 2011, Ben Romdhane was appointed as Saudi Second Division side Al-Adalah's manager. He was sacked on 1 December 2011. On 28 June 2012, Ben Romdhane was appointed as Saudi First Division side Al-Najma's manager. On 10 November 2012, Ben Romdhane was sacked from his post after a poor run of form which saw his side win just 2 games out of 9. He was replaced by compatriot Lotfi Kadri. On 12 December 2012, Ben Romdahne was appointed as Al-Riyadh's manager until the end of the 2012–13 season. Ben Romdhane managed to lead Al-Riyadh to a joint second place finish, however, they missed out on promotion after losing in the playoffs. On 31 May 2013, Ben Romdhane renewed his contract with Al-Riyadh for another season. On 2 September 2014, Ben Romdhane was appointed as Al-Batin's manager. On 12 February 2016, Ben Romdhane was sacked by Al-Batin despite winning their match against Al-Orobah on the same day. At the time of his sacking, Al-Batin sat in second place, one point behind first placed Al-Mujazzal. On 25 February 2016, Ben Romdhane was appointed as Al-Tai's manager until the end of the 2015–16 season.

On 2 May 2016, Ben Romdhane was appointed as Al-Fayha's manager. He managed to lead Al-Fayha to the First Division title and their first-ever promotion to the Pro League. On 20 June 2017, Ben Romdhane was appointed as Al-Hazem's manager. He was sacked on 5 April 2018 just two matches before the end of the season. At the time of his sacking, Al-Hazem sat at third, level on points with second-placed Al-Tai. Al-Hazem were eventually promoted to the Pro League under the management of Abdulwahab Al-Harbi. On 3 July 2018, Ben Romdhane was named as manager of hometown club JS Kairouan. He left the club after 3 matches and joined Najran on 3 October 2018. On 19 June 2019, Ben Romdhane was appointed as Al-Ain's manager. He managed to lead the club to their first-ever promotion to the Pro League.

On 24 September 2020, Ben Romdhane was appointed as Al-Fayha's manager following their relegation to the First Division. He managed to lead the club to promotion at the first time of asking. On 28 June 2021, Ben Romdhane was appointed Al-Wehda's manager. Ben Romdhane managed to get Al-Wehda promoted at the first time of asking. On 27 September 2022, Ben Romdhane was appointed as Al-Qadsiah's manager.

Managerial statistics

Honours

Manager
Al-Watani
 Saudi First Division: 2006–07 (as assistant manager)

Al-Fayha
 Saudi First Division: 2016–17
 Saudi First Division runners-up: 2020–21 (Promotion to Pro League)

Al-Ain
 Saudi First Division third place: 2019–20 (Promotion to Pro League)

Al-Wehda
 Saudi First Division third place: 2021–22 (Promotion to Pro League)

References

1970 births
Living people
Association football defenders
Tunisian footballers
JS Kairouan players
Tunisian Ligue Professionnelle 1 players
Tunisian football managers
Al-Watani Club managers
Al-Riyadh SC managers
Al Batin FC managers
Al-Ta'ee managers
Al-Fayha FC managers
Al-Hazm FC managers
JS Kairouan managers
Najran SC managers
Al-Ain FC (Saudi Arabia) managers
Al-Wehda Club (Mecca) managers
Al-Qadisiyah FC managers
Tunisian expatriate football managers
Expatriate football managers in Saudi Arabia
Tunisian expatriate sportspeople in Saudi Arabia
Saudi First Division League managers
Saudi Professional League managers